Mount Marshall is a rural locality in the Southern Downs Region, Queensland, Australia.

Geography 
The New England Highway enters the locality from the south (Glengallan) and exits to the north (Allora/Berat).

The land use is principally cropping with some grazing on native vegetation. There is an area of rural residential housing in the centre of the locality (approx ).

History 

Glengallan Station School opened circa 1886 for the education for the children of staff of Glengallan Homestead. In 1891 it became Glengallan Provisional School. On 1 January 1909 it became Glengallon State School. It closed in 1921. In late 1922 or early 1923 it was amalgamated with Wilsonville State School to become Mount Marshall State School. It closed in 1965. It was on the south-western corner of Hendon Mount Marshall Road and the New England Highway.

In October 1937, Mount Marshall Public Hall was opened. It was formerly the Hendon Hall that was relocated to Mount Marshall.

In the  Mount Marshall had a population of 243 people.

Economy 
There are a number of homesteads in the locality:

 Ashley Park
 Brae Brook
 Calinda
 Galloway Farm
 Nadele Park
 Rockcrest
 Yalmba

Education 
There are no school in Mount Marshall. The nearest government primary school is Allora State School in neighbouring Allora to the north-west. The nearest government secondary school are Allora State School (to Year 10). For education to Year 11, the nearest government secondary schools are Clifton State High School in Clifton to the north-west and Warwick State High School in Warwick to the south.

References

Southern Downs Region
Localities in Queensland